Formicoxenus quebecensis is a species of ant in the genus Formicoxenus. It is endemic to Canada.

References

External links

Myrmicinae
Hymenoptera of North America
Insects of Canada
Endemic fauna of Canada
Insects described in 1985
Taxonomy articles created by Polbot